The 2013–14 Midland Football Alliance season was the 20th and final in the history of Midland Football Alliance, a football competition in England.

At the end of the season the Midland Alliance and the Midland Combination merged to form the Midland Football League. The Midland Alliance clubs formed Premier Division, while the Midland Combination clubs formed Division One.

Clubs
The league featured 18 clubs from the previous season, along with four new clubs:
AFC Wulfrunians, promoted from the West Midlands (Regional) League
Quorn, transferred from the United Counties League
Shepshed Dynamo, transferred from the United Counties League
Walsall Wood, promoted from the Midland Combination

Eight clubs that have applied for promotion to Step 4 this season are:
Boldmere St. Michaels
Causeway United
Coleshill Town
Highgate United
Quorn
Stourport Swifts
Tividale
Westfields

League table

Results

References

External links
 Midland Football Alliance

2013-14
9